The 1973 Temple City Rams football team was an American football team that represented Temple City High School in the 1973 CIF Southern Section 2-A football season.

The Rams won 46 consecutive games from 1969 to 1973, setting the CIF Southern Section record for most consecutive wins. It also tied the California high school football state record originally set by St. Helena High School from 1960 to 1965. The streak was broken in a loss to Saint Francis High School on October 12, 1973, but Temple City still went on to win the Southern Section 2-A football championship for the fourth consecutive season. They beat North (Riverside) 21–13 in the 2-A championship game at Mt. San Antonio College's Hilmer Lodge Stadium.

The team returned 14 varsity lettermen from the 1972 team, and began training camp on August 27, 1973.

Schedule

Source:

Postseason honors
Fullback Rick Brown was selected CIF Southern Section 2-A Player of the Year on December 26, 1973, by the Citizens Savings Athletic Foundation. Brown, end Rich Mueller, tackle Ron Blankenbaker, linebacker Jeff Edwards, and defensive lineman Ross Malinowski received first-team CIF Southern Section 2-A Division honors.

References

High school football in the United States
1973 in sports in California